The  is a military intelligence and signal intelligence agency of the Japanese government, under the jurisdiction of the Japanese Ministry of Defense. It is currently one of the biggest Japanese intelligence agencies, with its creation and structure modeled after the American Defense Intelligence Agency.

History

Back in the 1980s, the former Defense Agency had several intelligence divisions with different duties. Among these intelligence divisions in the Defense Agency had included those from the Central Data Command Unit, the Joint Staff Council's Second Office and the three branches from the chiefs of staff in the Japan Self-Defense Forces (JSDF). Most of the DIH's establishment was based on the Second Investigation Bureau of the JGSDF. They were involved in intercepting communications that led to and after the shooting of Korean Air Lines Flight 007.

A supposed plan to integrate the intelligence divisions of the three JSDF branches started in 1988 before lack of cooperation and subordination ended it.

Plans to consolidate all the intelligence bureaus of the old Defense Administration into one agency had started in the 1990s after the National Diet had passed a law in May 1996, calling for the creation of a central military intelligence agency before the DIH was eventually established on January 20, 1997 after intelligence units from the JSDF, Japanese Defense Agency and the Joint Staff council are united with  the appointment of Lieutenant General Kunimi Masahiro as the agency's first commanding officer. Initially, DIH civilian and military staff members were numbered at 1,580 with a planned manpower of 2,000 personnel before it reached its current manpower of 2,300 staff members. In 2011, the manpower is 1,907 members

Spy satellites had been planned for launch in 1998 as part of augmenting the DIH's intelligence gathering capabilities. Though two were able to launch into space, two more were destroyed in a botch attempt to send them to space.

In 2005, the DIH has suffered its first internal leak of classified information when a Colonel in the JASDF had been arrested for allegedly leaking information regarding the accident of a People's Liberation Army Navy Submarine that took place in the same year in the South China Sea.

The DIH had announced in 2006 that a liaison office was established in Washington, D.C. with the National Security Agency.

Known activities
 After a North Korean Taepodong-1 ballistic missile had been launched on August 31, 1998, JSDF ships and aircraft began to search the Sea of Japan to collect any debris of the missile with the DIH providing intelligence support such as dispatching North Korean specialists to the United States over the matter.
 North Korean radio communications were intercepted by the SIGINT division's Kikaijima, Kagoshima radio monitoring station. The successful interception of North Korean communications later led to a naval shootout between ships of the Japan Coast Guard and a suspected North Korean spy boat in 2001 near the island of Amami-Ōshima before the latter had been destroyed.
 The DIH had provided intelligence to JGSDF forces that were deployed in Indonesia during the 2006 Yogyakarta earthquake.
 Using a signals intelligence facility in Tachiarai, the DIH reportedly monitor communications from transiting satellites, as part of a program codenamed MALLARD. The program reportedly intercepts more than 12 million Internet communications per day.

Command
The DIH is under the jurisdiction of the Joint Staff and is controlled by the Defense Intelligence Committee, which is made up of the Chiefs of Staff of the JGSDF, JMSDF and JASDF along with the Chief of Staff, Joint Staff, State Minister of Defense and the Minister of Defense.

Command of the DIH was given directly to the Japanese Minister of Defense in March 2006. The deputy officer is usually a civilian officially appointed by the MOD. Four Defense Intelligence Officers (DIOs) are also appointed with three being colonels from the JGSDF or the JASDF with one a civilian official.

The SIGINT facilities managed by the Chobetsu (Chosa Besshitsu) or the Annex Chamber, Second Section, Second Investigation Division in English, from 1958 to 1997 is managed by the DIH. Command of the SIGINT division is usually filled by a senior officer appointed by the NPA from the Prefectural Police.

Organization
A number of divisions were established under the DIH, including the following:

Role
The main role of the DIH is to collect information and analyse for planning defense and operation policy. The agency collect information from open sources, signals and image intelligence as well as from other Japanese government ministries, Japanese embassies and other affiliated ministries and organizations. In addition, they also gather intelligence through surveillance activities.

Seal
The seal of the DIH consist of the following symbols:
 Pheasant – Quality of intelligence gathering at high speed
 Red oval shapes around Earth – Positions of spy satellites
 Lightning – Radio waves
 Star – Section and Stations of the DIH

Known DIH directors
DIH directors are usually positioned by a Lieutenant General from the JGSDF/JASDF or a Vice Admiral from the JMSDF.

 Fumio Ota
 Kenichiro Hokazono; the former Chief of Air Staff
 Koji Shimohira

References

Bibliography

External links
 Official Site 

Japanese intelligence agencies
Military intelligence agencies
Signals intelligence agencies
National security institutions
Military communications of Japan